Morrone (Scottish Gaelic: Mór Bheinn, or Mór Shròn) is a Scottish hill immediately southwest of the village of Braemar in Aberdeenshire.

Morrone may also refer to:

Places 
 Montagne del Morrone, a mountain group in Abruzzo, central Italy, part of the Apennines
 Castel Morrone
 Morrone del Sannio
 Morrone Stadium, soccer stadium

People 
 Biagio Morrone (born 2000), Italian football player
 Camila Morrone (born 1997), Argentine female model and actress
 Edward Morrone, American politician
 Francis Morrone (born 1958), American architectural historian
 Frank Morrone, American audio engineer
 Giuliana Morrone, television presenter
 Joe Morrone (1935–2015), American college soccer coach
 Joe Morrone Jr. (born 1959), American soccer player
 Juan Carlos Morrone (born 1941), Argentine football player and manager
 Marc Morrone (born 1960), American animal dealer and breeder, and pet shop show host
 Megan Morrone (born 1973), American technology podcaster
 Stefano Morrone (born 1978), Italian football player

See also
 Pietro da Morrone, alternative name for Pope Celestine V
 Hermitage of Sant'Onofrio al Morrone, hermitage located in Abruzzo, Italy
 Morroni, people with the surname